Ukulele Baby! is the 33rd The Wiggles album release featuring guest vocalist Rolf Harris and Hey Hey It's Saturday host Daryl Somers. It was released on 5 February 2011 by ABC Music distributed by Universal Music Australia & won the 2011 ARIA for Best Children's album.

Track list
When I Strum My Ukulele
How Many Fingers Do I See?
Hula Hula Baby
Henry's Spinning
You Can Play The Ukulele
I'm Waving To You
Cluck Cluck City
The Good Ship Fabulous Flea (featuring Rolf Harris)
How Many You Want?
Hawaiian Boogie
Ooki Ooki Ooki Hear That Bouzouki
Hey Hey Its Saturday (featuring Daryl Somers)
Spagnola (Instrumental)
My Curly Sue Doll
Round And Round, Round And Round
Bambino (Instrumental)
Everybody Loves A Puppy 
Doo, Doo-doo, Doo! 
La Paloma
When I'm Painting 
How Many Fingers Do I See? (Instrumental) 
Toy Box 
Il Clan Dei Sicilani (Instrumental)

Video

Ukulele Baby! was released on ABC DVD in 2011.

Songs
When I Strum My Ukulele 
Hula Hula Baby 
How Many Fingers Do I See? 
Henry's Spinning 
You Can Play the Ukulele 
I'm Waving to You 
Cluck Cluck City 
The Good Ship Fabulous Flea! (featuring Rolf Harris) 
How Many You Want? 
Hawaiian Boogie 
Ooki, Ooki, Ooki, Hear That Old Bouzouki 
Hey, Hey, It's Saturday (Australian Version) / Thank You Mr. Weatherman! (American and UK Version) 
Spagnola (Instrumental) 
My Curly Sue Doll 
Round and Round, Round and Round 
Bambino (Instrumental) 
Everybody Loves a Puppy 
Doo, Doo-Doo, Doo! 
La Paloma 
When I'm Painting 
Toy Box

Home releases

DVD

Notes

References

External links

The Wiggles albums
The Wiggles videos
2011 albums
ARIA Award-winning albums
2011 video albums
Australian children's musical films